Urophora doganlari is a species of tephritid or fruit flies in the genus Urophora of the family Tephritidae.

Distribution
Turkey.

References

Urophora
Insects described in 2006
Diptera of Asia